T. hilli  may refer to:
 Taphozous hilli, the Hill's sheath-tailed bat or Hill's tomb bat, a bat species found only in Australia
 Thala hilli, a sea snail species
 Thylacoleo hilli, an extinct carnivorous marsupial species that lived in Australia from the late Pliocene to the late Pleistocene

See also
 Hilli (disambiguation)